Teerthanker Mahaveer Medical College & Research Centre is a medical college and tertiary care center located in Moradabad in Moradabad district, Uttar Pradesh, India. The college was established in 2008 and is affiliated with Teerthanker Mahaveer University, Moradabad.

References

Private medical colleges in India
Medical colleges in Uttar Pradesh
Education in Moradabad
Educational institutions established in 2008
2008 establishments in Uttar Pradesh